The Battle of Sidi Barrani  1940) was the opening battle of Operation Compass, the first big British attack of the Western Desert Campaign of the Second World War. Sidi Barrani, on the Mediterranean coast in Egypt, had been occupied by the Italian 10th Army, during the Italian invasion of Egypt  and was attacked by British, Commonwealth and imperial troops, who re-captured the port.

By late on 12 December, the only Italian positions left in Egypt were at the approaches to Sollum and the vicinity of Sidi Omar.

Background

Libya

Cyrenaica, the eastern province of Libya had been an Italian colony since the Italo-Turkish War (1911–1912). With Tunisia, a part of French North Africa to the west and Egypt to the east, the Italians prepared to defend both frontiers with a North Africa Supreme Headquarters, under the command of the Governor-General of Italian Libya, Marshal of the Air Force, Italo Balbo. Supreme Headquarters had the 5th Army (General Italo Gariboldi) and the 10th Army (General Mario Berti) which in mid-1940 had nine metropolitan divisions of about  each, three Blackshirt ( and two Italian Libyan Colonial Divisions with  each.

In the late 30s, Italian divisions had been cut from three regiments each to two for increased mobility once they were mechanised; reservists were recalled in 1939, along with the usual call-up of conscripts. Morale was considered to be high and the Army had recent experience of military operations. The Royal Navy had prospered under the Fascist regime, which had paid for fast, well-built and well-armed ships and a large submarine fleet but the navy lacked experience and training. The Royal Air Force  had stagnated and by 1939 was not considered by the British to be capable of a high rate of operations. The 5th Army, with eight divisions, was in Tripolitania, the province adjacent to Tunisia and the 10th Army, with six divisions, held Cyrenaica in the east; when war was declared, the 10th Army moved the 1st Libyan Division to the frontier from Giarabub (Jaghbub) to Sidi Omar and XXI Corps from Sidi Omar to the coast, Bardia and Tobruk; XXII Corps moved south-west of Tobruk as a counter-attack force.

Egypt

The British had based military forces in Egypt since 1882 but the number was greatly reduced by the terms of the Anglo-Egyptian Treaty of 1936. The small British and Commonwealth force garrisoned the Suez Canal and the Red Sea route, which was vital to British communications with its Far Eastern and Indian Ocean territories. In mid-1939, Lieutenant-General Archibald Wavell was appointed General Officer Commanding-in-Chief (GOC-in-C) of the new Middle East Command, over the Mediterranean and Middle East theatres. Until the Franco-Axis armistice, the French divisions in Tunisia faced the Italian 5th Army on the Libya–Tunisia border.

British forces included the Mobile Division (Egypt) (Major-General Percy Hobart), one of only two British armoured training formations, which in mid-1939 was renamed Armoured Division (Egypt) (on 16 February 1940, it became the 7th Armoured Division). The Egypt–Libya border was defended by the Egyptian Frontier Force and in June 1940, the headquarters of the 6th Infantry Division (Major-General Richard O'Connor) took over command in the Western Desert, with instructions to drive back the Italians from their frontier posts and dominate the hinterland if war began. The 7th Armoured Division less the 7th Armoured Brigade, assembled at Mersa Matruh and sent the 7th Support Group forward towards the frontier as a covering force, where the RAF also moved most of its bombers; Malta was also reinforced.

The HQ of the 6th Infantry Division, which lacked complete and fully trained units, was renamed the Western Desert Force (WDF) on 17 June. In Italian East Africa were another  and African troops with   tanks and  Italy declared war from 11 June 1940.

Supply
On land, supplies had to be carried long distances by road or in small consignments by coaster. The road could flood, was vulnerable to the Desert Air Force (DAF) and alternative desert tracks increased vehicle wear.

The geographical position of Italy made it possible to close the Mediterranean if war came, making the British Mediterranean Fleet, based in Egyptian ports, dependent on the Suez Canal for supply. In 1939, Wavell began to plan a base in the Middle East for about fifteen divisions (300,000 men), six in Egypt, three in Palestine and the rest further afield. Much of the material was imported from the colonies and the rest obtained locally by stimulating the production of import substitutes. The plan to establish the infrastructure for a garrison of nine divisions in Egypt and Palestine was increased to fourteen by June 1941, then to  1942. A water pipeline was begun along the railway and sources of water surveyed. Wells were dug but most became tainted by salt water and in 1939, the main sources of fresh water were Roman aqueducts at Matruh and Maaten Bagush.

Water boats from Alexandria and a distillation plant at Matruh increased supply but rigorous economy had to be enforced and much water had to be moved overland to outlying areas. The number of vehicles available in 1939 was inadequate and lorries were diverted to provide the Armoured Division with a better rear link; only the desert-worthy vehicles could be risked off-road, which left tanks unable to move far from Matruh. In September 1940, the New Zealand Railway Battalion and Indian labourers began work on the coastal railway and reached Sidi Barrani by October 1941.

Terrain

Scorpions, vipers and flies populated the region, which was inhabited by a small number of Bedouin nomads, whose tracks linked wells (birs) and the easier traversed ground.

Navigation was reliant on the sun, stars, compass bearings and "desert sense", good perception of the environment gained by experience. When Italian troops advanced into Egypt in September 1940, the Maletti Group got lost leaving Sidi Omar and had to be found by reconnaissance aircraft. In spring and summer, days are miserably hot and nights very cold.

Prelude

Frontier skirmishes 

On 11 June 1940, hostilities commenced and the British were ordered to dominate the frontier and begin the Siege of Giarabub. The British crossed into Libya that night, exchanged fire with Italian troops at Sidi Omar and discovered that some of them were unaware that war had been declared. On 14 June, the British captured Fort Capuzzo and Fort Maddalena, taking  Two days later, the British raided a convoy on the Tobruk–Bardia road, killed  troops and took  including  Romolo Lastrucci, the 10th Army Chief Engineer.

The British patrolled the frontier area as far west as Tobruk, establishing dominance over the 10th Army. On 5 August, thirty Italian tanks and the 8th Hussars fought an inconclusive action and Wavell concluded that vehicle wear made it impractical to continue operations when an Italian offensive loomed. Sand wore out equipment quickly, shortening the track life of tanks, spare parts ran out and only half the tank strength could be kept operational. A lull fell from August–early September, as Operation Hats a naval operation, reinforced the Mediterranean Fleet and helped to bring an army convoy of tanks and crews via the Cape.

On 13 September 1940, the invasion began as a limited tactical operation towards Matruh, rather than the strategic objectives sketched in Rome, due to the chronic lack of transport, fuel and wireless equipment, even with transfers from the 5th Army. Musiad was subjected to a "spectacular" artillery bombardment at dawn and occupied. Sollum and the airfield were taken by the 1st Libyan Division and by evening the 2nd Libyan Division, 63rd Infantry Division "Cirene" and the Maletti Group from Musaid and the 62nd Infantry Division "Marmarica" from Sidi Omar, pushed past British harassing parties and converged on Halfaya Pass. The British withdrew past Buq Buq on 14 September and continued to harass the Italian advance, while falling back to Alam Hamid the next day and Alam el Dab on 16 September. An Italian force of fifty tanks attempted a flanking move, which led the British rearguard to retire east of Sidi Barrani. The port was occupied by the 1st CC.NN. Division "23 Marzo" and Graziani halted the advance. The British resumed observation and the 7th Armoured Division prepared to challenge an attack on Matruh.

British road demolitions were repaired, wells cleaned and work commenced on a water pipe-line from the frontier, to accumulate supplies for the resumption of the advance in mid-December. Egypt broke off diplomatic relations with the Axis and Italian aircraft bombed Cairo on 19 October. British naval and air operations to harass the Italian army continued and caused damage which prisoners reported had caused a lowering of morale. British armoured car patrols dominated no man's land but the loss of advanced landing grounds reduced the effectiveness of the RAF and Malta was put out of range. An extra armoured car company joined the British reconnaissance operations far behind the front line and the WDF was reinforced by a new tank regiment with Matilda II tanks. The British began to prepare a raid on the central group of Italian encampments of 4 to 5 days' duration and then on Sofafi, rather than wait for the Italians.

British plan

Following the Italian advance, Wavell ordered the commander of British Troops Egypt, Lieutenant-General Sir Henry Maitland Wilson to plan a limited operation to push the Italians back. Wavell had noted that the Italian defensive positions were too far apart for mutual support. Operation Compass, for administrative reasons, was originally planned as a five-day raid but an extension was contemplated if it succeeded. The 7th Support Group was to observe the Italian camps at Sofafi and prevent Italian moves from the west, while the rest of the division and 4th Indian Division passed through the Sofafi–Nibeiwa gap. An Indian brigade and Infantry tanks (I tanks) of 7th Royal Tank Regiment (7th RTR) would attack Nibeiwa from the west, as the 7th Armoured Division protected their northern flank. Once Nibeiwa was captured a second Indian brigade and the 7th RTR would attack the Tummars.

The Matruh Garrison Force (3rd Battalion Coldstream Guards, plus some artillery) would contain the enemy camp at Maktila on the coast and the Royal Navy would bombard Maktila and Sidi Barrani. Assuming success, Sidi Barrani would be attacked on the second day by the 4th Indian Division and a westward exploitation would follow. Preparations were made in the strictest secrecy and only a few officers knew during the training exercise held from  that the objectives marked out near Matruh were replicas of Nibeiwa and Tummar and that the exercise was a rehearsal; the troops were told that a second exercise was to follow and many did not know that the operation was real until 7 December, as they arrived at their start positions.

To obtain a measure of air superiority, eleven Vickers Wellington bombers from Malta attacked Castel Benito on 7 December and destroyed  on the ground. Next day, three fighter squadrons patrolled the British concentration areas and during the night, 29 Wellingtons and Blenheims bombed Benina and damaged ten aircraft. Bristol Bombays attacked the Italian camps and Blenheims raided advanced airfields. The force put a dummy tank brigade in the desert as a decoy for Italian aircraft and by dawn on 9 December, was just short of Maktila.

Italian defensive preparations

In December 1940 the 10th Army in Egypt had been reinforced to about nine Binary, Blackshirt and colonial divisions east of the frontier and had begun unit reliefs, which made it harder for the British to establish the Italian order of battle.

The 64th Infantry Division "Catanzaro" had been moved east of Buq Buq to the Khur–Samalus area, behind the Nibeiwa–Rabia gap. To the west was the XXIII Corps with the 1st CC.NN. Division "23 Marzo", 2nd CC.NN. Division "28 Ottobre"; the 62nd Infantry Division "Marmarica" was on the escarpment from Sofafi to Halfaya. The 10th Army had about 80,000 men, 250 guns, 120 tanks inside Egypt. Some bombers were far to the west at Tripoli and others at Benghazi and Tmimi. The short-range fighters and reconnaissance aircraft were at Tobruk, El Adem and Gambut.

Battle

Capture of Sidi Barrani

Selby Force guarded the eastern approaches to Sidi Barrani, as the rest of the WDF attacked the fortified camps further inland. On 10 December, the 4th Armoured Brigade, which had been screening the attackers from a possible Italian counter-attack from the west, advanced northwards, cut the coast road between Sidi Barrani and Buq Buq and sent armoured car patrols westwards. The 7th Armoured Brigade remained in reserve and the 7th Support Group blocked an approach from Rabia and Sofafi to the south. News of the fall of Nibeiwa reached Selby at  who sent troops to block the western exists from Maktila. Difficult going and darkness slowed the move and the 1st Libyan Division escaped. Late on 9 December, O'Connor and Beresford-Pierce sent the 16th Infantry Brigade (Brigadier Cyril Lomax) from reserve to cut the roads into Sidi Barrani, two field artillery regiments supported the advance and the 7th RTR rushed to get unserviceable tanks back into action. Sidi Barrani was defended by two Italian divisions in eight strongpoints, each defended by a battalion but the defensive perimeter was too long for effective command.

The 16th Brigade started its advance at  without waiting for the artillery and 7th RTR (which were late) but was repelled by Italian artillery fire; three hours later, when two heavy artillery regiments had arrived, the 16th Brigade attacked again, supported by a squadron of Matilda tanks, RAF aircraft, Royal Navy ships and artillery fire. The fighting went on for all the morning, without substantial gains, until  when the Blackshirts holding two strongholds on the western side of the perimeter suddenly surrendered. Shortly afterwards, the brigade cut the south and west roads from Sidi Barrani. Beresford-Pierce ordered an attack before dark since the dust storm was sporadic and the British would be exposed to view. The brigade advanced with the last of the Infantry tanks, an extra infantry battalion and support from the 2nd Royal Tank Regiment (2nd RTR), with cruiser and light tanks, on the left flank. The attack began just after  backed by the divisional artillery. After driving  the dust storm abated and the infantry dismounted as Italian artillery opened fire. The last ten Matildas moved up on the left and drove into the western face of the Sidi Barrani defences, south of the main road, then disappeared into the sandstorm. Italian artillery ammunition proved ineffective against Matilda tanks; the gunners fought on with rifles and hand grenades but were overrun. In two hours the first objectives had been captured along the west side of the port, part of the south side and the artillery lines had been overrun.

Selby Force
Reinforcements released by the fall of the Tummars arrived to the west of the 16th Brigade and advanced through the port, trapping the last of the 1st Libyan Division, the 2nd Libyan Division and the 4th CC.NN. Cruiser tanks of the 6th Royal Tank Regiment (6th RTR) arrived in the sandstorm and overran the Italians in the dunes at about  then joined Selby Force to continue the pursuit. The Italian defenders were caught in a  pocket backing onto the sea. When the British attacked again at dawn on 11 December, mass surrenders began except at Point 90 (known to the Italians as ), where 2,000 troops of the 2nd and 16th Battalions of the 2nd Libyan Division held out until the early afternoon of 11 December.

Aftermath

Casualties

Subsequent operations

On 11 December, the 7th Armoured Brigade was ordered out of reserve to relieve the 4th Armoured Brigade in the Buq Buq area to mop up. Large numbers of men and guns were captured and a patrol from the 7th Support Group entered Rabia to find it empty, as the 63rd Infantry Division "Cirene" had withdrawn from there and Sofafi overnight. An order to the 4th Armoured Brigade to cut them off arrived too late and the Italians retreated along the top of the escarpment to the Italian garrison at Halfaya. The 4th Armoured Brigade, on top of the escarpment and the 7th Armoured Brigade on the coast, tried to pursue the Italians despite acute supply problems, exacerbated by the large number of prisoners (twenty times the number expected) and found it extremely difficult to advance.

While retreating from Sidi Barrani and Buq Buq, Italian forces crowded on the coast road and were easy targets for Terror and two gunboats, which bombarded the Sollum area all day and most of the night of 11 December. By late on 12 December, the remaining Italian positions in Egypt were those at the approaches to Sollum and the vicinity of Sidi Omar; by 15 December, Sollum and the Halfaya Pass had been captured. The British advance by-passed Italian garrisons further south in the desert. The 7th Armoured Division concentrated south-west of Bardia, waiting for the arrival of 6th Australian Division.

Orders of battle

See also 

 List of British military equipment of World War II
List of Australian military equipment of World War II
 List of Italian military equipment in World War II

References

Bibliography

Further reading

External links

 7th Armoured Division, engagements 1940
 Italian order of battle, 1 November 1940 – February 1941
 British order of battle, 1 November 1940 – February 1941

1940 in Egypt
Western Desert campaign
Battles of World War II involving the United Kingdom
Battles of World War II involving Italy
Sidi Barrani
December 1940 events
Matrouh Governorate